Yvonne Hill  (born 24 July 1937) is an Australian sport shooter. 

She was born in Stirling, Western Australia. She competed at the 1980 Summer Olympics in Moscow, in mixed 50 metre rifle prone.

References

External links 
 

1937 births
Living people
Sportspeople from Perth, Western Australia
Australian female sport shooters
Olympic shooters of Australia
ISSF rifle shooters
Shooters at the 1980 Summer Olympics
20th-century Australian women
21st-century Australian women